Pill Hill, also known as "High Street Hill," is a neighborhood of Brookline, Massachusetts, United States, and part of Greater Boston.

History

Pill Hill became part of Brookline in 1844, when it was annexed from Boston.

Noted abolitionist Samuel Philbrick lived in Brookline at 182 Walnut Street during the mid-19th century.   His home eventually became a stop for the Underground Railroad.

Like other Pill Hills in the United States, Pill Hill in Brookline was nicknamed for the large numbers of doctors in the neighborhood. That was likely due to its proximity to hospitals in the Longwood Medical and Academic Area of Boston.  "High Street Hill" is the older and more formal name for the neighborhood. The neighborhood has been listed on the National Register of Historic Places as the Pill Hill Historic District.  Pill Hill is one of seven Local Historic Districts in Brookline.

Geography

Settlement and borders
Pill Hill is centered along High Street, but also includes Allerton Street and Cumberland and Pond Avenues, and Hawthorn, Glen and Edgehill Roads.

Pill Hill immediately borders other Brookline neighborhoods, including Brookline Village to its north and the historically working-class neighborhood known as The Point ("Whiskey Point") to its south. Pill Hill also lies adjacent to Olmsted Park and Leverett Pond to its east (part of Greater Boston's Emerald Necklace park system); parkland which in turn borders the Boston neighborhoods of Jamaica Plain and Mission Hill.

The neighborhood is also near Route 9, a major Massachusetts highway.

Climate

Brookline falls under the USDA 6b Plant Hardiness zone.

Demographics

The most commonly reported ethnicities/ancestries in Pill Hill are Irish (20.7%), various Asian ancestries (14.6%), English (6.7%), Italian (6.5%), and Russian (6.1%).  Additionally, 2.4% of those living in Pill Hill have Spanish ancestry.

17.9% of Pill Hill residents are foreign born.

Languages

The most common language spoken in Pill Hill is English, spoken by 72.9% of households. Other languages spoken in the neighborhood include Spanish, Mandarin Chinese, and French.

Culture

Pill Hill is mostly residential but also has places of commerce, particularly operating along Boylston Street/Route 9.

Architecture
The Pill Hill neighborhood of Brookline has various examples of Victorian architecture.

Sites

Philbrick Square, a park designed by Frederick Law Olmsted in the 1880s, is located in Pill Hill.
The historic Free Hospital for Women has been located in Pill Hill since 1895.
The historic Hotel Adelaide is located in Pill Hill on High Street.  Hotel Adelaide is no longer a functioning hotel, however, and instead presently serves as residential apartments.

Public transportation

Light rail and subway
Pill Hill's close proximity to Brookline Village, allows for easy access to the MBTA's Green Line D-train at Brookline Village (MBTA station).  Additionally, Pill Hill is in close proximity to the Green Line E-train line in the Mission Hill neighborhood of Boston, notably the Riverway stop.

Both D and E lines of the MBTA's Green Line have service to downtown Boston.

Bus

Pill Hill is also served by MBTA bus service.

Education

Public schools
The local public school is the William H. Lincoln School.

Notable residents

Samuel Philbrick, abolitionist, lived in Pill Hill in the mid-19th century

Photo gallery

References

Brookline, Massachusetts
Neighborhoods in Massachusetts
Geography of Norfolk County, Massachusetts